James Henderson was an English professional football inside forward who played in the Football League for Newcastle United and Ashington.

Personal life 
Henderson served as a private in the Lancashire Fusiliers during the First World War.

Career statistics

References 

English footballers
English Football League players
Place of death missing
Newcastle United F.C. players
Footballers from Newcastle upon Tyne
Year of birth missing
Place of birth missing
Year of death missing
Association football inside forwards
Lancashire Fusiliers soldiers
Cardiff City F.C. players
Ashington A.F.C. players
Spennymoor United F.C. players
Southern Football League players
British Army personnel of World War I